Prince Ferdinand Pius (Ferdinando Pio Maria), Duke of Castro (25 July 1869, Rome – 7 January 1960, Lindau), was head of the House of Bourbon-Two Sicilies and pretender to the throne of the extinct Kingdom of the Two Sicilies from 1934 to 1960.

Family
Ferdinand was the eldest child of Prince Alfonso, Count of Caserta and his wife Princess Maria Antonietta of Bourbon-Two Sicilies. He was a grandson of Ferdinand II of the Two Sicilies and an older brother of Prince Carlos of Bourbon-Two Sicilies, Maria Immaculata, Princess Johann Georg of Saxony, Maria Cristina, Archduchess Peter Ferdinand of Austria, Maria di Grazia, Princess Imperial of Brazil, Prince Ranieri, Duke of Castro, Prince Philip of Bourbon-Two Sicilies, and Prince Gabriel of Bourbon-Two Sicilies.

Marriage
Ferdinand married Princess Maria Ludwiga Theresia of Bavaria, daughter of King Ludwig III of Bavaria on 31 May 1897.  They had six children:

Princess Maria Antonietta (1898–1957)
Princess Maria Cristina (1899–1985), married in 1948 to Manuel Sotomayor-Luna, Vice President of Ecuador
Prince Ruggiero Maria, Duke of Noto (1901–1914)
Princess Barbara Maria Antonietta Luitpolda (1902–1927), married in 1922 to Count Franz Xaver zu Stolberg-Wernigerode
Princess Lucia Maria Raniera (1908–2001), married in 1938 to Prince Eugenio of Savoy, Duke of Ancona
Princess Urraca Maria Isabella Carolina Aldegonda (1913–1999)

Ferdinand and Maria lived for many years at Villa Amsee, Lindau.  It was there that he died in 1960.

Disputed succession
Following Ferdinand's death, the headship of the House of Bourbon-Two Sicilies was claimed by both his nephew Infante Alfonso, Duke of Calabria, and his brother Prince Ranieri, Duke of Castro, and remains disputed between their descendants. The basis of Alfonso’s claim was that his late father, Prince Carlos of Bourbon-Two Sicilies (1870–1949), had been Ferdinand's next oldest brother. But Henri, Count of Paris, upheld the claim of Ferdinand's younger brother, Prince Ranieri, Duke of Castro (1883–1973), contending that Carlos had renounced his rights of succession for himself and his descendants in 1901 when he married the Spanish heiress presumptive María de las Mercedes, Princess of Asturias. The Count of Paris was well aware that his own claim to the French throne depended on the validity of the renunciation in 1713 of Philippe, Duc d'Anjou, in favor of the junior House of Orléans.

In 1900, Prince Carlos had executed the Act of Cannes, in anticipation of his marriage to María de las Mercedes, and in 1901 he became a Spanish subject and accepted the title of Infante. The position of Ranieri was that by so doing Carlos had renounced any claim to the throne of the Two Sicilies. But Alfonso had a different interpretation, which was that the Act of Cannes would have taken effect only if Mercedes and Carlos had succeeded to the Spanish throne. He also argued that the Act of Cannes was invalid under the succession rules of the house of Two Sicilies. The dispute remains unresolved.

Honours
Grand Master of the Sacred Military Constantinian Order of Saint George
Grand Master of the Order of Saint Januarius
Grand Master of the Order of Saint Ferdinand and of Merit
Grand Master of the Royal Order of Francis I
Grand Master of the Order of Saint George and Reunion
Knight of the Spanish Order of the Golden Fleece
Knight of the Order of Saint Hubert of Bavaria
Knight of the Supreme Order of the Most Holy Annunciation
Bailiff Grand Cross of Honor and Devotion of the Sovereign Military Order of Malta
Knight Grand Cross of the Order of Charles III

Arms

Ancestry

References

1869 births
1960 deaths
19th-century Roman Catholics
20th-century Roman Catholics
Burials at the Church of Saints Peter and Paul (Rieden, Swabia)
Dukes of Calabria
Dukes of Castro
Dukes of Noto
Italian Roman Catholics
Knights of Malta
Knights of the Golden Fleece of Spain
Nobility from Rome
Pretenders to the throne of the Kingdom of the Two Sicilies
Princes of Bourbon-Two Sicilies